San Juan Hill was a community in what is now the Lincoln Square neighborhood of the Upper West Side in Manhattan, New York City. Its residents were mostly African-American, Afro-Caribbean, and Puerto Rican, and comprised one of the largest African-American communities in New York before World War I. San Juan Hill was bound by 59th Street to the south, West End Avenue to the west, 65th Street to the north, and Amsterdam Avenue (part of Tenth Avenue) to the east. The site is now occupied by Lincoln Center, a  complex dedicated to the performing arts.

Etymology
There are different opinions as to why the area was called San Juan Hill. Some critics say that it refers to the Spanish–American War of 1898 fought in Cuba. It is also said that it was because African-American veterans from the war lived in the area. Others say that the name was given to the area due to the constant ethnic gang fights between African-Americans and Irish-American gangs.

History
African-Americans moved into the area around the late 19th century from Little Africa in Greenwich Village, where an earlier African-American community existed. Before the construction of Lincoln Center and the subsequent destruction of San Juan Hill, jazz and art thrived in this area as its popularity began to grow. The neighborhood had a jazz club called "Jungle Cafe" nicknamed the jungle by the members of the neighborhood. This term was used by Milton Mezz Mezzrow, a white jazz clarinetist. Mezzrow was introduced to jazz while living in Harlem, where he heard recordings of James P. Johnson, the pianist from San Juan Hill in which he said "Here’s a boy from the Jungles who makes all the other piano players look sick!”  Moreover, this basement club was where the Charleston dance was reputedly born and got its start. The area's musical history continues today at Jazz at Lincoln Center. Historian Marcy S. Sacks writes that San Juan Hill had many tenement basement clubs ranging from dives to higher-level clubs. And that there were also poolrooms, saloons, dance halls, and bordellos.

Before there was Harlem, there was San Juan Hill. Like Harlem, heavily populated by Black people.  It was also called 'The Jungles'. There was a place on Sixty-second street) called the Jungles Casino a dance hall. It was also known as Drake's Dancing Class. Many of the customers came from the Carolina and Georgia sea islands. They were known as Gullahs and the Geechies. This is where the dance the Charleston was born. James P. Johnson published a number called "The Charleston", which was later used in a Broadway show called Runnin' Wild in 1923. 

San Juan Hill had many African-American churches that, according to historian Marcy Sacks, moved into the area around the 1880s and 1890s. Among these were St. Mark's Methodist Episcopal, Mt. Olivet Baptist, as well as St. Benedict the Moor Church in neighboring Hell's Kitchen. The area had numerous community and fraternal organizations, such as the Grand United Order of Odd Fellows, Negro Elks, and the Colored Freemasons. This community also attracted war veterans returning from the Spanish- American War of 1898 which could have given rise to its name.

On October 8, 2022, David Geffen Hall opened with a tribute to San Juan Hill. David Geffen Hall was formally known as Avery Fisher at Lincoln Center. 

The opening of David Geffen Hall opened with two concerts with works composed by and featuring Etienne Charles. The new work is called, San Juan Hill: A New York Story-which was performed by Etienne Charles & Creole Soul, and the New York Philharmonic conducted by Music Director Jaap van Zweden.    

San Juan Hill: A New York Story is a multimedia work via music, visuals, first-person accounts of the history of the San Juan Hill neighborhood that was razed to build the Lincoln Center complex. 

The San Juan Hill: A New York Story uses the sounds of music of the people who use to live in San Juan Hill. Multiple musical traditions and sounds; Ragtime, Jazz Stride piano, Swing, Blues, Mambo, Paseo, Antillean Waltz, Calypso, Funk, Disco, Bebop along with historical film clips and interviews. It is stated in an article that Lincoln Center chose San Juan Hill: A New York Story to lay the foundation for a new future for Lincoln Center and diversity.

Displacement
San Juan Hill was mostly erased due to the mid-20th-century sweep of urban renewal to create Lincoln Center, displacing thousands of families, and removing the history that the neighborhood existed. In the early 20th century African-Americans started to move uptown from San Juan Hill to Harlem. The African-American population decreased while the Puerto Rican population grew. More Puerto Rican families started moving there in the 1950s coinciding with a massive influx of Puerto Rican migration after World War II. In the 1940s the neighborhood of San Juan Hill was designated as a slum and called "the worst slum district of New York City" by the New York City Housing Authority. 

In 1947, the City of New York made San Juan Hill an area for redevelopment. Parts of San Juan Hill, from 61st to 64th Streets along Amsterdam to West End Avenues were demolished in 1947 to make way for the Amsterdam Houses project, completed in 1948. More than 1,100 families, mostly African-American and Puerto Rican, were evicted to build the Amsterdam Houses. During this time, the displacement of more than 7,000 lower-class families and 800 businesses occurred, largely because of an increase in real estate prices resulting from the ongoing renewal process. Although 4,400 new housing units were intended for future residents, the actual price rooms would rent for after the completion of the urban renewal project ranged from $40-$50 a unit, well out of the price range of original residents. Few tenement houses still stand in the neighborhood today, one such survivor being the 1906-Phipps Houses on 63rd Street. The buildings make up the oldest affordable housing units in the neighborhood, offering building amenities at the time of their construction that could not be found in the overcrowded, unsanitary, poorly-maintained tenement apartments most of the city's working class then-lived in. The Phipps Houses drew many families to the neighborhood seeking a healthy, safe and accessible living environment in which to raise their children, marking the beginnings of San Juan Hill's development in the first half of the twentieth century into a vibrant working-class district predominated by African Americans and (later) Puerto Ricans. The strong appeal comfortable affordable housing had for families of humble means at the turn of the century can be found in the recollections of Roseanna Weston, a resident of San Juan Hill who lived in Phipps Houses as a child. Weston recounted that her family had previously occupied a run-down tenement and had moved to Phipps in order to escape the deleterious environment of the slums. Known as the ideal tenement, Phipps was one of the last tenement buildings left standing after the demolition of San Juan Hill.

Writing-off the area of San Juan Hill as a slum was the first step in a post-WWII city redevelopment scheme that would spell the end of the working-class neighborhood. Robert Moses, chairman of the Committee on Slum Clearance and leader of city urban renewal projects throughout most of the 1950s and 1960s, employed a federal statute (Title I of the Housing Act of 1949) allowing for the seizing of land in San Juan Hill under the mechanism of eminent domain to facilitate his urban renewal projects. These projects created housing for the middle class while displacing lower-income families and made room for the performing arts complex of Lincoln Center. This post-WWII transformation of San Juan Hill neighborhood is considered to be an early example of urban gentrification.

In the 1950s, the neighborhood was almost completely torn down and Lincoln Center was built. By 1955, Robert Moses struck a deal with the Met Opera to develop the neighborhood north of Columbus Circle into a home for the arts. Other organizations such as Fordham University, the New York Philharmonic, and the Juilliard School of Music soon followed suit moved their headquarters and campuses to the center. The area had been the home of over 17,000 residents. Construction on the development project started in 1959.

Legacy

San Juan Hill was known as the birthplace of the Charleston and Bebop. Today, Lincoln Center is the home of the New York City Opera, New York Philharmonic, New York City Ballet, and the Metropolitan Opera.

The 1926 David Belasco musical Lulu Belle is set in part in the community. It was adapted into the 1948 film.

Location work for the film West Side Story (1961) used parts of San Juan Hill following the condemning of the neighborhood's buildings; piles of debris from recently demolished buildings feature in many shots. The same neighborhood serves as the setting for the 2021 film, with the added context of the impending construction of Lincoln Center serving as a major plot point.

Notable residents

Thelonious Monk, the jazz pianist, grew up in San Juan Hill, raised in the Phipps houses on West 63rd street. A portion of a street in the old San Juan Hill neighborhood was named after Thelonious Monk. After his death, Monk's family created the Thelonious Monk Foundation to help improve music education throughout the United States. Jazz pianist Herbie Nichols was also born in the neighborhood, and became a friend of Monk later in life.

Pianist James P. Johnson, one of the pioneers of the stride style of piano playing family moved to San Juan Hill in 1908. Johnson composed the Roaring Twenties popular song "Charleston". Willie "The Lion" Smith, Luckey Roberts, were co-pioneers in the creation of the stride piano technique.Notable historian Arturo Schomburg, of the Schomburg Center for Research in Black Culture,  lived in San Juan Hill with his first wife and 3 sons. 

Barbara Hillary, the first African-American woman to reach the North Pole, and then the first African-American woman to reach the South Pole, and therefore the first African-American woman to have reached both poles, was born in the neighborhood.

See also
Vintage Photos: The Lost San Juan Hill, Lincoln Center, and a West Side Story
 The Case Against Lincoln Center (1968)
 A City Versus its People: the Triumph of Lincoln Center and the Tragedy of San Juan Hill

External links
 WEEKEND HISTORY: San Juan Hill
 The Many Lives of San Juan Hill a project of Landmark West!, an architecture, arts, and culture non-profit organization.
 Legacies of San Juan Hill a project of Lincoln Center for the Performing Arts

References

History of Manhattan
African-American history in New York City
Former New York City neighborhoods
Neighborhoods in Manhattan